Ernest Legouve may refer to:
Ernest Legouvé, Gabriel Jean Baptiste Ernest Wilfrid Legouvé, French dramatist
Ernest Legouve Reef, in the South Pacific Ocean